Marcos Ariel Pinto (born 25 January 1994) is an Argentine professional footballer who plays as a left back for Greek Super League 2 club Panserraikos.

Career

Barracas Central
In the summer 2019, Pinto joined Primera B Nacional club Barracas Central. He left the club by the end of his contract in the summer 2020.

References

External links

1994 births
Living people
Argentine footballers
Argentine Primera División players
Club Atlético Lanús footballers
San Martín de San Juan footballers
Club Atlético Temperley footballers
Barracas Central players
Panserraikos F.C. players
Association football forwards
People from Formosa, Argentina